Hungerfordia may refer to: 

Hungerfordia (gastropod), a genus of land snails
Hungerfordia (alga), a fossil genus of algae